Kurtamzali is a village in the municipality of Dojran, North Macedonia. It is located close to the Greek border.

Demographics
As of the 2021 census, Kurtamzali had 42 residents with the following ethnic composition:
Turks 32
Persons for whom data are taken from administrative sources 10

According to the 2002 census, the village had a total of 121 inhabitants. Ethnic groups in the village include:
Turks 119
Others 2

References

Villages in Dojran Municipality
Turkish communities in North Macedonia